"Little Garden" ("My Little Garden") is a song recorded by South Korean singer Taeyeon for the soundtrack of the 2021 drama series Jirisan. It was released as a digital single on November 28, 2021, by AStory and Most Contents, under license by Dreamus.

Background and release 
On August 19, 2021, AStory confirmed that Taeyeon would be named in the first lineup to record the soundtrack for the drama series Jirisan. This marked the first time Taeyeon released a soundtrack recording after fifteen months, following "Kiss Me" for Do You Like Brahms? (2020). The song was released on November 28, 2021, its music video was released on November 30, 2021.

Composition 
"Little Garden" was described as a ballad led the intro with strings combined with melodic accompaniment of the piano create a dramatic atmosphere, excepting heavy echo and emotion were evoked with Taeyeon's warm and relaxed vocals, while its lyrics written like a fairytale. "Little Garden" was composed in the key of B major, with a tempo of 80 beats per minute.

The song, titled "" (literally "My Little Garden") in Korean and "Little Garden" in English, was written by Lee Joo-hyeong (MonoTree) and produced by Gaemi, who had previously produced the soundtracks for television series such as Descendants of the Sun, Moonlight Drawn by Clouds, When the Camellia Blooms and The World of the Married.

Track listing

Credits
Credits adapted from Melon.

Produced by Gaemi
Lyrics by Lee Joo-hyeong (MonoTree)
Music by Gaemi
Arranged by Lee Joo-hyeong (MonoTree) and jun-p (MonoTree)
Guitar performed by Jukjae
Bass performed by Koo Bon-am
Keyboard performed by jun-p
Strings arranged and conducted by Nile Lee
Strings performed by On the String

Vocal directed by Lee Joo-hyeong
Digital editing by Lee Joo-hyeong
Recorded by Kwon Yu-jin at doobdoob Studio, Oh Seong-geun at T Studio
Mixed by Koo Jong-pil at Klang Studio
Mastered by Kwon Nam-woo at 821 Sound Mastering
Promotion videos by Kang Su-yeon
Cover designed by Baek Seo-young
Executive producer: AStory (에이스토리), MOST CONTENTS (모스트콘텐츠)

Charts

Accolades

Release history

References

2021 singles
2021 songs
Korean-language songs
Love themes
Taeyeon songs
South Korean television drama theme songs